Mexilana saluposi is a species of crustacean in the family Cirolanidae, the only species in the genus Mexilana. It is endemic to Mexico.

References

Cymothoida
Endemic crustaceans of Mexico
Monotypic arthropod genera
Crustacean genera
Taxonomy articles created by Polbot